The 2019 GP Industria & Artigianato di Larciano was the 51st edition of the GP Industria & Artigianato di Larciano road cycling one-day race, which was held on 10 March 2019. The 1.HC-category race was a part of the 2019 UCI Europe Tour.

Teams 
Seven UCI WorldTeams, eleven UCI Professional Continental teams, six UCI Continental teams, and one national team make up the twenty-five teams that participated in the race. Only two of the twenty-five teams did not enter the maximum squad of seven riders; these two teams ( and ) each entered six riders. Of the 173 riders, there was one non-starter, while 90 riders finished.

UCI WorldTeams

 
 
 
 
 
 
 

UCI Professional Continental Teams

 
 
 
 
 
 
 
 
 
 
 

UCI Continental Teams

 
 
 
 
 
 

National Teams

 Italy

Result

References 

GP Industria and Artigianato di Larciano
GP Industria and Artigianato di Larciano
2019